H.H. Maharani Sethu Parvathi Bai N.S.S. College for Women (also known as NSS College for Women) is one of the oldest undergraduate and postgraduate women's colleges in Neeramankara, Trivandrum, Kerala. It was established in 1951. The college is affiliated with Kerala University. It offers courses in arts, science and commerce.

Departments

Science

Physics
Chemistry
Mathematics & Statistics
Botany
Zoology
Home Science

Arts and Commerce

Malayalam
English
Hindi
History
Economics
Philosophy
Physical Education
Music
Commerce

Accreditation
The college is recognized by the University Grants Commission (UGC).

Notable alumni
 Shermi Ulahannan ,2010 asian games gold medalist. ( former indian kabbadi player )
 Vinduja Menon, Malayalam film actress

References

External links
http://www.nsscollege4women.edu.in

Educational institutions established in 1951
1951 establishments in India
Arts and Science colleges in Kerala
Colleges affiliated to the University of Kerala
Universities and colleges in Thiruvananthapuram district
Women's universities and colleges in Kerala